Diplomystus is an extinct genus of freshwater clupeomorph fish distantly related to modern-day extant herrings, alewives, and sardines.  The genus was first named and described by Edward Drinker Cope in 1877. There are seven species of Diplomystus: D. dentatus (Cope, 1877), D. birdii, D. dubetreiti, D. shengliensis (Chang 1983), D. kokuraensis (Uyeno 1979), D. primotinus (Uyeno 1979), and D. altiformis.

Diplomystus dentatus (Cope, 1877) is well known from lower Eocene deposits from the Green River Formation in Wyoming. Specimens range from larval size to 65 cm and are commonly found in close association with the extinct herring Knightia sp. The Green River Formation is the remnant of a large lake whose mud would eventually be transformed into soft calcite-bearing shale. D. kokuraensis (Uyeno 1979), D. primotinus (Uyeno 1979), and D. altiformis were dominant members of an Early Cretaceous lake fauna (the "Diplomystus-Wakinoichthys Fauna") in what is now Japan and Korea.

References

Bibliography

Prehistoric ray-finned fish genera
Clupeiformes
Cretaceous bony fish
Eocene fish
Priabonian genus extinctions
Prehistoric fish of North America
Natural history of Wyoming
Early Cretaceous fish of Asia
Valanginian genus first appearances
Freshwater fish